Adinkra may refer to
 Adinkra symbols that represent concepts or aphorisms
Adinkra symbols (physics) used in the supergravity theory
Fiifi Adinkra (born 1987), Ghanaian blogger and publicist
Joseph Narh Adinkra, Chief of Staff of the Ghana Army